Lander is a surname. Notable people with the surname include:

 Anton Lander (born 1991), Swedish ice hockey player
 Bernard Lander (1915–2010), Founder of Touro College
 Brad Lander (living), American politician
 Bruce Lander (born 1946), Judge of the Federal Court of Australia
 David Lander (1947–2020), American actor, comedian and author
 Eric Lander (born 1957), American professor of biology 
 Frederick W. Lander (1822–1862), American engineer 
 Harald Lander (1905–1971), Danish balletmaster and husband of Margot Lander
 Henry W. Lander (1826–1904), American lawyer and politician
 Jarl Lander (1944–2014), Swedish politician
 John Lander (explorer) (1807–1839), Cornish explorer
 Jasmin Lander (born 2000), Danish curler
 Jim Lander (1930–2020), American politician
 John St Helier Lander (1868–1944), British artist
 John Lander (rower) (1907–1941), British rower; gold medalist at the 1928 Summer Olympics
 Johnny Lander, English footballer
 Leena Lander (born 1955), Finnish writer
 Mabel Lander (1882–1955), British pianist and teacher
 Margot Lander (1910–1961), Norwegian-born prima ballerina 
 Morgan Lander (born 1982), Canadian heavy metal singer
 Nicholas Lander (born 1952), Restaurant writer and consultant
 Nicholas Sèan Lander (born 1948), Australian botanist
 Richard Lemon Lander (1804–1834), Cornish explorer of western Africa
 Sir Stephen Lander (born 1947), British security/anti-crime official 
 Tim Lander (born 1938), Canadian poet

See also
 Landers (surname) 
 Lender (disambiguation)#People